Trupp is a surname. Notable people with the surname include:

Alexei Trupp (1858–1918), Footman in the household of Tsar Nicholas II of Russia
Evan Trupp (born 1987), American professional ice hockey player
Nathan Trupp (born 1947), American serial killer
Richard Trupp (born 1973), British sculptor

See also
Truppführer, Nazi Party paramilitary rank
Truppführer (modern), German term for the position of a unit/troop leader
Troop, military sub-subunit

References